Sally Carns Gulde is a graphic designer.

A native of Oklahoma and a graduate of Wheaton College, Carns designs art and packaging for the Nashville music industry. In 1999, the National Academy of Recording Arts and Sciences presented Carns with a Grammy Award for her design of the album Ride with Bob by country swing band Asleep at the Wheel. Her work has been featured in numerous design magazines (PRINT, Communication Arts, HOW), won local, regional and national ADDY's, and nominated for a DOVE award.

See also
Grammy Awards of 2000

References

External links
Online portfolio

American graphic designers
American women graphic designers
Living people
Artists from Oak Park, Illinois
Year of birth missing (living people)
21st-century American women